Fernando Affonso Collor de Mello (born 12 August 1949) is a Brazilian politician who served as the 32nd president of Brazil from 1990 to 1992, when he resigned in a failed attempt to stop his impeachment trial by the Brazilian Senate. Collor was the first President democratically elected after the end of the Brazilian military government. He became the youngest president in Brazilian history, taking office at the age of 40. After he resigned from the presidency, the impeachment trial on charges of corruption continued. Collor was found guilty by the Senate and disqualified from holding elected office for eight years (1992–2000). He was later acquitted of ordinary criminal charges in his judicial trial before Brazil's Supreme Federal Court, for lack of valid evidence.

Fernando Collor was born into a political family. He is the son of the former Senator  and Leda Collor (daughter of former Labour Minister Lindolfo Collor, led by his father, former governor of Alagoas and proprietor of the Arnon de Mello Organization, a media conglomerate which manages the state-wide television station TV Gazeta de Alagoas, the affiliate of TV Globo in the state.)
"Collor" is a Portuguese adaptation of the German surname Köhler, from his maternal grandfather Lindolfo Leopoldo Boeckel Collor.

Collor has served as Senator for Alagoas since February 2007. He first won election in 2006 and was reelected in 2014. In August 2017, Collor was accused by Brazil's Supreme Federal Court of receiving around US$9 million in bribes between 2010 and 2014 from Petrobras subsidiary BR Distributor.

Early career
Collor became president of Brazilian football club Centro Sportivo Alagoano (CSA) in 1976. After entering politics, he was successively named mayor of Alagoas' capital Maceió in 1979 (National Renewal Alliance Party), elected a federal deputy (Democratic Social Party) in 1982, and eventually elected governor of the small Northeastern state of Alagoas (Brazilian Democratic Movement Party) in 1986.

During his term as governor, he attracted publicity by allegedly fighting high salaries for public servants, whom he labeled marajás (maharajas) (likening them to the former princes of India who received a stipend from the government as compensation for relinquishing their lands). How well his policies reduced public expense is disputed, but the political position certainly made him popular in the country. This helped boost his political career, with the help of television appearances in nationwide broadcasts (quite unusual for a governor from such a small state).

Presidency (1990-1992) 

In 1989 Collor defeated Luiz Inácio Lula da Silva in a controversial two-round presidential race with 35 million votes. 
In December 1989, days prior to the second round, businessman Abílio Diniz was the victim of a sensational political kidnapping. The act is recognized as an attempt to sabotage Lula's chances of victory by associating the kidnapping with the left wing. At the time, Brazilian law barred any party from addressing the media on the days prior to election day. Lula's party thus had no opportunity to clarify the accusations that the party (PT) was involved in the kidnapping. Collor won in the state of São Paulo against many prominent political figures. The first President of Brazil elected by popular vote in 29 years, Collor spent the early years of his presidency battling inflation, which at times reached rates of 25% a month.

The very day he took office, Collor launched the Plano Collor (Collor Plan), implemented by his finance minister Zélia Cardoso de Mello (not related to Collor). The plan attempted to reduce the money supply by forcibly converting large portions of consumer bank accounts into non-cashable government bonds, while at the same time increasing the printing of money bills, a counterbalancing measure to combat hyper-inflation.

Free trade, privatization and state reforms

Under Zélia's tenure as Brazil's Minister of Finances, the country had a period of major changes, featuring what ISTOÉ magazine called an "unprecedented revolution" in many levels of public administration: "privatization, opening its market to free trade, encouraging industrial modernization, temporary control of the hyper-inflation and public debt reduction."

In the month before Collor took power, hyperinflation was at 90 percent per month and climbing. All accounts over 50,000 cruzeiros (about US$500 at that time), were frozen for several weeks. He also proposed freezes in wages and prices, as well as major cuts in government spending. The measures were received unenthusiastically by the people, though many felt that radical measures were necessary to kill the hyperinflation. Within a few months, however, inflation resumed, eventually reaching rates of 10 percent a month.

During the course of his government, Collor was accused of condoning an influence peddling scheme. The accusations weighed on the government and led Collor and his team to an institutional crisis leading to a loss of credibility that reached the finance minister, Zélia.

This political crisis had negative consequences on his ability to carry out his policies and reforms. The Plano Collor I, under Zélia would be renewed with the implementation of the Plano Collor II; the government's loss of prestige would make that follow-up plan short-lived and largely ineffective. The failure of Zélia and Plano Collor I led to their substitution by Marcílio Marques Moreira and his Plano Collor II. Moreira's plan tried to correct some aspects of the first plan, but it was too late. Collor's administration was paralyzed by the fast deterioration of his image, through a succession of corruption accusations.

During the Plano Collor, yearly inflation was at first reduced from 30,000 percent in 1990 (Collor's first year in government) to 400 percent in 1991, but then climbed back up to 1,020 percent in 1992 (when he left office). Inflation continued to rise to 2,294 percent in 1994 (two years after he left office).
Although Zélia acknowledged later that the Plano Collor didn't end inflation, she also stated: "It is also possible to see with clarity that, under very difficult conditions, we promoted the balancing of the national debt – and that, together with the commercial opening, it created the basis for the implementation of the Plano Real."

Parts of Collor's free trade and privatization program were followed by his successors: Itamar Franco (Collor's running mate), Fernando Henrique Cardoso (a member of the Franco cabinet) and Lula da Silva. Collor's administration privatized 15 different companies (including Acesita), and began the process of privatizing several others, such as Embraer, Telebrás and Companhia Vale do Rio Doce. Some members of Collor's government were also part of the later Cardoso administration in different or similar functions: 

Luiz Carlos Bresser-Pereira, a minister in the previous Sarney and the following Fernando Henrique Cardoso administrations, stated that "Collor changed the political agenda in the country, because he implemented brave and very necessary reforms, and he pursued fiscal adjustments. Although other attempts had been made since 1987, it was during Collor's administration that old statist ideas were confronted and combated (...) by a brave agenda of economic reforms geared towards free trade and privatization."
According to Philippe Faucher, professor of political science at McGill University, the combination of the political crisis and the hyperinflation continued to reduce Collor's credibility and in that political vacuum an impeachment process took place, precipitated by Pedro Collor's (Fernando Collor's brother) accusations and other social and political sectors which thought they would be harmed by his policies.

Awards
In 1991, UNICEF chose three health programs: community agents, lay midwives and eradication of measles as the best in the world. These programs were promoted during Collor's administration. Until 1989, the Brazilian vaccination record, was considered the worst in South America. During Collor's administration, Brazil's vaccination program won a United Nations prize, as the best in South America. Collor's project Minha Gente (My People) won the UN award Project Model for the Humanity in 1993.

Corruption charges and impeachment

In May 1992, Fernando Collor's brother Pedro Collor accused him of condoning an influence peddling scheme run by his campaign treasurer, Paulo César Farias. The Federal Police and the Federal Prosecution Service opened an investigation. On 1 July 1992, a Joint Parliamentary Commission of Inquiry, composed of Senators and members of the Chamber of Deputies, formed in Congress to investigate the accusation and review the evidence uncovered by police and federal prosecutors. Senator  was chosen as the rapporteur of the Commission of Inquiry, chaired by Congressman . Farias, Pedro Collor, government officials and others were subpoenaed and gave depositions before it. Some weeks later, with the investigation progressing and under fire, Collor asked on national television for the people's support in going out in the street and protesting against "coup" forces. On 11 August 1992, thousands of students organized by the National Student Union (União Nacional dos Estudantes – UNE), protested on the street against Collor. Their faces, often painted in a mixture of the colors of the flag and protest-black, lead to them being called "Caras-pintadas" ("Painted Faces").

On 26 August 1992, the final congressional inquiry was approved 16–5. The report concluded that there was proof that Fernando Collor had had personal expenses paid for by money raised by Paulo César Farias through his influence peddling scheme.

As a result, a petition to the Chamber of Deputies by citizens Barbosa Lima Sobrinho and Marcelo Lavenère Machado, respectively the then President of the Brazilian Press Association and the then-president of the Brazilian Bar Association formally accused Collor of crimes of responsibility (the Brazilian equivalent of "high crimes and misdemeanors", such as abuse of power) warranting removal from office per the constitutional and legal norms for impeachment. In Brazil, a formal petition for impeachment of the President must be submitted by one or more private citizens, not by corporations or public institutions.

The formal petition, submitted on 1 September 1992, began impeachment proceedings. The Chamber of Deputies set up a special committee on 3 September 1992 to study the impeachment petition. On 24 September 1992, the committee voted (32 votes in favour, one vote against, one abstention) to approve the impeachment petition and recommend that the full Chamber of Deputies accept the charges of impeachment. Under the Constitution of Brazil, the impeachment process required two thirds of the Chamber of Deputies to vote to allow the charges of impeachment to be escalated to the Senate. On 29 September 1992, Collor was impeached by the Chamber of Deputies, with more than two thirds of its members concurring. In the decisive roll call vote, 441 deputies voted for and 38 deputies voted against the admission of the charges of impeachment.

On 30 September 1992, the accusation was formally sent from the Chamber of Deputies to the Senate, and proceedings for impeachment began in the upper house. The Senate formed a committee to examine the case file and determine whether all legal formalities had been followed. The Committee issued its report, recognizing that the charges of impeachment had been presented in accordance with the Constitution and the laws, and proposed that the Senate organize itself into a court of impeachment to conduct the trial of the president. On 1 October 1992, this report was presented on the floor of the Senate, and the full Senate voted to accept it and to proceed. That day the then-president of the Federal Supreme Court, Justice , was notified of the opening of the trial process in the Senate, and began to preside over the process. On 2 October 1992, Collor received a formal summons from the Brazilian Senate notifying him that the Senate had accepted the report, and that he was now a defendant in an impeachment trial. Per the Constitution of Brazil, upon receipt of that writ of summons, Collor's presidential powers were suspended for 180 days, and vice president Itamar Franco became acting president. The Senate also sent an official communication to the office of the vice-president to formally acquaint him of the suspension of the President, and to give him notice that he was now the acting president.

By the end of December, it was obvious that Collor would be convicted and removed from office by the Senate. In hopes of staving this off, Collor resigned on 29 December 1992 on the last day of the proceedings. Collor's resignation letter was read by his attorney in the floor of the Senate, and the impeachment trial was adjourned so that the Congress could meet in joint session, first to take formal notice of the resignation and proclaim the office of president vacant, and then to swear in Franco.

However, after the inauguration of Franco, the Senate resumed sitting as a court of impeachment with the president of the Supreme Court presiding. Collor's attorneys argued that with Collor's resignation, the impeachment trial could not proceed and should close without ruling on the merits. The attorneys arguing for Collor's removal, however, argued that the trial should continue, to determine whether or not the defendant should face the constitutional penalty of suspension of political rights for eight years. The Senate voted to continue the trial. It ruled that, although the possible penalty of removal from office had been rendered moot, the determination of the former President's guilt or innocence was still relevant because a conviction on charges of impeachment would carry with it a disqualification from holding public office for eight years. The Senate found that, since the trial had already begun, the defendant could not use his right to resign the presidency as a means to avoid a ruling.

Later, in the early hours of 30 December 1992, by the required two-thirds majority, the Senate found the former president guilty of the charges of impeachment. Of the 81 members of the Senate, 79 took part in the final vote: 76 Senators voted to convict the former president, and 3 voted to acquit. The penalty of removal from office was not imposed as Collor had already resigned, but as a result of his conviction the Senate barred Collor from holding public office for eight years. After the vote, the Senate issued a formal written opinion summarizing the conclusions and orders resulting from the judgement, as required by Brazilian law. The Senate's formal written sentence on the impeachment trial, containing its conviction of the former president and disqualification from public office for eight years, signed by the president of the Supreme Court and by the Senators on 30 December 1992, was published in the Diário Oficial da União (the Brazilian Federal Government's official journal) on 31 December 1992.

In 1993, Collor challenged before the Brazilian Supreme Court the Senate's decision to continue the trial after his resignation but the Supreme Court ruled the Senate's action valid.

In 1994, the Supreme Court tried the ordinary criminal charges stemming from the Farias corruption affair; the ordinary criminal accusation was presented by the Brazilian federal prosecution service (Ministério Público Federal). The Supreme Court had original jurisdiction under the Brazilian Constitution because Collor was one of the defendants and the charges mentioned crimes committed by a President while in office. If found guilty of the charges, the former president would face a jail sentence. However, Collor was found not guilty. The Federal Supreme Court threw out the corruption charges against him on a technicality, citing a lack of evidence linking Collor to Farias' influence-peddling scheme. A key piece of evidence, Paulo César Farias' personal computer, was ruled inadmissible as it had been obtained during an illegal police search conducted without a search warrant. Other pieces of evidence that were only gathered because of the information first extracted from files stored in Farias' computer were also voided, as the Collor defense successfully invoked the fruit of the poisonous tree doctrine before the Brazilian Supreme Court. Evidence that was only obtained because of the illegally obtained information was also struck from the record.

After his acquittal in the criminal trial, Collor again attempted to void the suspension of his political rights imposed by the Senate, without success, as the Supreme Court ruled that the judicial trial of the ordinary criminal charges and the political trial of the charges of impeachment were independent spheres. Collor thus only regained his political rights in 2000, after the expiration of the eight year disqualification imposed by the Brazilian Senate.

Collor's version of the impeachment
For several years after his removal from office, Collor maintained a website which has since been taken offline. In discussing the events surrounding the corruption charges, the former website stated: "After two and half years of the most intense investigation in Brazilian history, the Supreme Court of Brazil declared him innocent of all charges. Today he is the only politician in Brazil to have an officially clear record validated by an investigation by all interests and sectors of the opposition government. Furthermore, President Fernando Collor signed the initial document authorizing the investigation."

Post-presidency

In 2000, Collor joined the Brazilian Labour Renewal Party (PRTB) and ran for mayor of São Paulo. His candidacy was declared invalid by the electoral authorities, as his political rights were still suspended by the filing deadline. In 2002, with political rights restored, he ran for Governor of Alagoas, but lost to incumbent Governor , who was seeking reelection.

In 2006, Collor was elected to the Federal Senate representing his state of Alagoas, with 44.03% of the vote, running again against Lessa. The following year he abandoned PRTB and switched to the Brazilian Labour Party (PTB). Collor has been, since March 2009, Chairman of the Senate Infrastructure Commission. Collor ran again for Governor of Alagoas in 2010. However, he lost the race, finishing a narrow third after Lessa and incumbent Teotonio Vilela Filho, thus eliminated from the runoff. This was Collor's second electoral loss.

In 2014, Collor was re-elected to the Senate with 55% of the vote.

On 20 August 2015, Collor was charged by the Prosecutor General of Brazil with corruption, as a development of Operation Car Wash. Details of the charge were kept under wraps so as not to jeopardize the investigation.

In 2016, Collor abandoned PTB and joined the Christian Labour Party (PTC), a small Christian democratic party which had no representatives in the Congress at the time. Collor also voted to impeach Rousseff as Senator.

In 2019, Collor left PTC and joined the Republican Party of the Social Order.

In 2022, Collor left the Republican Party of the Social Order and rejoined the Brazilian Labour Party (current). 
Also in 2022, Collor ran for Governor of Alagoas, placing 3rd and not making the run-off. Collor garnered 14,57% of the votes.

Honour

Foreign honours
:
 Honorary Recipient of the Order of the Crown of the Realm (1991)
:
 Grand Cross of the Order of the Tower and Sword (1991)
:
  Collar of the Order of Isabella the Catholic (10 May 1991)

See also
 List of mayors of Maceió
 List of scandals in Brazil

References

External links

 Fernando Collor - O Senador de Alagoas 

|-

1949 births
Living people
People from Rio de Janeiro (city)
Impeached Presidents of Brazil
Governors of Alagoas
Members of the Federal Senate (Brazil)
Brazilian people of German descent
Impeached presidents removed from office
National Renewal Alliance politicians
Democratic Social Party politicians
Brazilian Democratic Movement politicians
Christian Labour Party politicians
Brazilian Labour Renewal Party politicians
Brazilian Labour Party (current) politicians
Republican Party of the Social Order politicians
Brazilian politicians convicted of corruption